WESZ-LP (98.7 FM, "Oldies 98.7") is a radio station licensed to serve Abbeville, Alabama.  The station is owned by Abbeville Broadcasting Inc. It airs an Oldies music format.

The station was assigned the WESZ-LP call letters by the Federal Communications Commission on December 27, 2002.

References

External links
WESZ-LP official website

WESZ-LP service area per the FCC database

ESZ-LP
ESZ-LP
Oldies radio stations in the United States
Radio stations established in 2004
2004 establishments in Alabama
Henry County, Alabama